Karl-Johannes Soonpää (born Karl-Johannes Soonberg; 2 March 1895 in Pangodi Parish (now Kambja Parish), Kreis Dorpat – 15 June 1944 near Elva, Estonia) was an Estonian politician and civil servant.

Soonpää participated in the Estonian War of Independence as a lieutenant and received the Cross of Liberty for his service.

Soonpää studied at the Faculty of Religion and the Faculty of Agriculture of the University of Tartu, graduating in 1926. Afterwards, he became involved in politics, joining the Settlers' Party, then after the 1932 party merger, the Union of Settlers and Smallholders. He was a member of the III, IV and V Riigikogu. He also served as the Minister of Labour for a year, from 1927 until 1928, the Minister of Agriculture  from 1928 until 1929 and the State Auditor from 1929 until 1940.Political offices:   

He was one of the few high-ranking statesmen who escaped the June deportation by Soviet authorities following the Soviet occupation of Estonia. In the early morning of 14 June 1941, he had learned from acquaintances that a large number of suspicious railway wagons had been brought Elva railway station. Soonpää took fled on his bicycle and his wife Antonie left the family farm with the children. Soonpää gathered with other men in the forest, and joined the Forest brothers. On 22 June 1941, the men learned of Operation Barbarossa, the German invasion of the Soviet Union, and hid in the forest until the arrival of the Germans in July.

Following the reoccupation of Estonia by the Soviets in 1944, Soonpää was killed in June, aged 49, when he tried to capture Soviet saboteurs with two men at night in the forest near Elva. He was buried in Elva cemetery.

References

1895 births
1944 deaths
People from Kambja Parish
People from Kreis Dorpat
Settlers' Party politicians
Government ministers of Estonia
Members of the Riigikogu, 1926–1929
Members of the Riigikogu, 1929–1932
Members of the Riigikogu, 1932–1934
Estonian anti-communists
Estonian independence activists
University of Tartu alumni
Estonian military personnel of the Estonian War of Independence
Estonian people of World War II
Recipients of the Cross of Liberty (Estonia)
Military personnel killed in World War II